Christopher Guy Harrison (3 September 1960 – 19 August 2020) was a British luxury furniture designer. He was the founder and head designer of the international furnishings brand. Originally known for a wide range of decorative mirrors, the Christopher Guy brand grew into a collection of upholstery, chairs, dining tables, sofas, headboards, and office furniture. In 2017, Christopher Guy partnered with rug manufacturer Nourison to create a new line of luxury area rugs.  Christopher's signature design includes the patented Chris-X (pronounced kris-krôs) leg design.

Biography 
Christopher Guy Harrison was born in Britain and raised in Spain and France. He drew on his international background to fuse design influences from around the world. In 1993, Christopher formed Harrison & Gil. The company then expanded by offering a complete lifestyle and luxury furniture collection in 2005. It re-launched under the brand name Christopher Guy. In 1999, Christopher designed and built a one million square foot workshop complex in Java to accommodate the 1,400 carvers, woodcarvers and specialist finishers that craft his designs. Christopher resided in Singapore where he has his headquarters and travelled around the world particularly to Java and Los Angeles.

Harrison died on 19 August 2020 from lung cancer, at the age of 59.

USA Flagship Design Lounge 
In October 2009, Guy opened his  USA Flagship Design Lounge in Beverly Hills. The lounge, complete with plasma TV's mounted on the walls for interactive viewing, showcases his newest collection of the year.

Design philosophy 
Guy's furniture designs reflect a contemporary mood with Timeless values. His Chris-X leg design is patented across the USA, China and Europe. This design is seen throughout his collections and was inspired by the corseted waistline of Scarlett O'Hara in Gone with the Wind and the crossed legs of a ballerina. “My aim was to design a chair that was simple, sophisticated and flexible enough to work with a variety of style categories,” said Guy.

Awards 
The British Interior Design Association awarded Guy the Outstanding Design award in 2004. The World Market Center Las Vegas and Las Vegas Design Center recognize Guy as the 2011 Design Icon on 27 January 2011. The Design Icon award celebrates modern-day design legends and gives them a platform to share their stories and inspire others. Past Design Icon recipients include Juan Montoya, Vicente Wolf, Roger Thomas, Vladimir Kagan, and Larry Laslo. In May of 2014, he was awarded an honorary doctorate from Otis College of Art and Design.

Past Projects

Hotels 
 Divan Asia Hotel, Turkey
 St. Clemente Palace, Venice
 The Trump Plaza, New York
 The Savoy, London
 The Beverly Wilshire, California
 The Ritz-Carlton properties
 The Bellagio, Las Vegas
 The Venetian, Las Vegas
 The Curtiss, Buffalo
 Encore, Las VegasFilms:
Burj Al Arab Hotel (Al Mahara restaurant), Dubai
Titanic Deluxe Golf Belek, Turkey
One&Only Royal Mirage, Dubai

Film 
 2010, The Resident
 2009, Hotel room design The Hangover
 2006, Casino Royale
 2006, The Devil Wears Prada
 2007, Stardust
 2007, Sleuth
 2007, Room 1408
 2007, Ocean’s Thirteen
2014, The Interview
 2015 The Georgian Restaurant Harrods
2015, Mall Cop 2
2016 , The Aftermath
2019, Cold Pursuit

References

External links 

 Official Web site

1960 births
2020 deaths
English furniture designers
Deaths from lung cancer